The 10th West Virginia Infantry Regiment was an infantry regiment that served in the Union Army during the American Civil War.

Service
The 10th West Virginia Infantry Regiment was organized at Camp Pickens, Canaan, Glenville, Clarkesville, Sutton, Philippi, and Piedmont in western Virginia between March 12 and May 18, 1862. The regiment was mustered out on August 9, 1865.

Casualties
The 10th West Virginia Infantry Regiment suffered 2 Officers and 93 enlisted men killed in battle or died from wounds, and 1 officer and 107 enlisted men dead from disease 
for a total of 207 fatalities.

References

The Civil War Archive

See also
West Virginia Units in the Civil War
West Virginia in the Civil War

Units and formations of the Union Army from West Virginia
1862 establishments in Virginia
Military units and formations established in 1862
Military units and formations disestablished in 1865